These are the official results of the Men's Javelin Throw event at the 1990 European Championships in Split, Yugoslavia, held at Stadion Poljud on 27 and 28 August 1990. The qualification mark was set at 80.00 metres.

Medalists

Schedule
All times are Central European Time (UTC+1)

Abbreviations
All results shown are in metres

Records

Qualification

Group A

Group B

Final

Participation
According to an unofficial count, 30 athletes from 15 countries participated in the event.

 (1)
 (1)
 (3)
 (1)
 (3)
 (1)
 (2)
 (1)
 (3)
 (3)
 (1)
 (1)
 (3)
 (3)
 (3)

See also
 1988 Men's Olympic Javelin Throw (Seoul)
 1991 Men's World Championships Javelin Throw (Tokyo)
 1992 Men's Olympic Javelin Throw (Barcelona)

References

 Results
 koti.welho

Javelin throw
Javelin throw at the European Athletics Championships